Neeraj Suri is an American-Austrian computer scientist. He is a Distinguished University Professor at Lancaster University (UK)  and an adjunct professor of Computer Science at the University of Massachusetts at Amherst.

He holds a MS and PhD from the University of Massachusetts at Amherst. His research focuses on Trustworthy Computing, notably the experimental validation of software including quantification of dependability and security. He is a member of the IFIP WG10.4 on Dependable Computing and Fault Tolerance. He is a recipient of the NSF CAREER, Microsoft and IBM faculty awards

Most-cited publications
 Saxena D, Raychoudhury V, Suri N, Becker C, Cao J. Named data networking: a survey. Computer Science Review. 2016 Feb 1;19:15-55.  (Cited 202 times, according to Google Scholar  )
 Kopetz H, Suri N. Compositional design of RT systems: A conceptual basis for specification of linking interfaces. InSixth IEEE International Symposium on Object-Oriented Real-Time Distributed Computing, 2003. 2003 May 16 (pp. 51–60). (Cited144 times, according to Google Scholar.) 
 Hiller M, Jhumka A, Suri N. An approach for analysing the propagation of data errors in software. In2001 International Conference on Dependable Systems and Networks 2001 Jul 1 (pp. 161–170).  (Cited 136 times, according to Google Scholar.)

References

Living people
American computer scientists
University of Massachusetts Amherst faculty
University of Massachusetts Amherst alumni
Year of birth missing (living people)
Academics of Lancaster University